Black Fell is a hill in the North Pennines, England. It is located just north of the A686 road, west of Alston and is one of the most northerly parts of the Pennines.

Hewitts of England
Nuttalls
Mountains and hills of the Pennines
Mountains and hills of Cumbria
Kirkoswald, Cumbria